Victor Walcott (born 12 April 1962) is a Barbadian cricketer. He played in twenty first-class and nineteen List A matches for the Barbados cricket team from 1987 to 1994.

See also
 List of Barbadian representative cricketers

References

External links
 

1962 births
Living people
Barbadian cricketers
Barbados cricketers
People from Christ Church, Barbados